Sri Siva Vishnu Temple (SSVT) is a Hindu temple located in Lanham, Maryland, right outside of Washington D.C. It is one of the largest temples in the United States.

Location
The Temple is located on Cipriano Road one mile away from the NASA Goddard Space Flight Center. There are two temples located on the same road. The Murugan Temple of North America is located in the vicinity.

Deities
The main deities represented in the temple include Shiva as Ramanathaswamy (the deity of the Rameswaram Temple) and Vishnu as Ananthapadmanabha (the deity of the Padmanabhaswamy Temple). Along with them, there  are shrines for Parvathi, Lakshmi, Saraswathi, Durga, Rama, Krishna, Ganapathi, Subrahmanya, Andal, Hanuman and Navagrahas. Ayyappa has a separate shrine in the model of the famous Sabarimala temple, with 18 steps.

Cultural 
The Sri Siva Vishnu Temple hosts several cultural programs throughout the year. These include concerts and dance performances by community and featured artists.

Photo gallery

References

Asian-American culture in Maryland
Hindu temples in Maryland
Lanham, Maryland
Religious buildings and structures in Prince George's County, Maryland
Religious buildings and structures completed in 2002
2002 establishments in Maryland
Indian-American culture in Maryland
Buildings and structures in Prince George's County, Maryland